The 1996 Marshall Thundering Herd football team represented Marshall University as a member of Southern Conference (SoCon) during the 1996 NCAA Division I-AA football season. Led by first-year head coach Bob Pruett, the Thundering Herd compiled an overall record of 15–0 with mark of 8–0 in conference play, winning the SoCon title. Marshall advanced to the NCAA Division I-AA National Championship playoffs, where they beat Delaware in the first round, Furman in the quarterfinals,  in the semifinals, and Montana in the NCAA Division I-AA Championship Game to win the program's second NCAA Division I-AA title. 1996 was Marshall's final season competing at the NCAA Division I-AA level as they moved to NCAA Division I-A competition and joined the Mid-American Conference (MAC) in 1997.

Schedule

Roster

Game summaries

Howard

West Virginia State

Georgia Southern

Western Kentucky

Chattanooga

VMI

Western Carolina

Appalachian State

The Citadel

East Tennessee State

Furman

Delaware (Division I-AA First Round Playoff Game)

Randy Moss caught 8 passes (3 TD) for a school record 288 yards.

Furman (Division I-AA Quarterfinal Playoff Game)

Northern Iowa (Division I-AA Semifinal Playoff Game)

Montana (Division I-AA National Championship)

Randy Moss hauled in 9 passes for 220 yards and 4 TD as the Thundering Herd avenged the previous season's loss to Montana in the title game.

References

Marshall
Marshall Thundering Herd football seasons
NCAA Division I Football Champions
Southern Conference football champion seasons
College football undefeated seasons
Marshall Thundering Herd football